, provisional designation , is a Mercury-crossing asteroid. It makes close approaches to all of the inner planets and asteroid 4 Vesta. In January 2018 there was much media hype about this asteroid being classified as a potentially hazardous asteroid, although there is no known threat of an impact for hundreds if not thousands of years. The media has compared the size of the asteroid to the Burj Khalifa in Dubai.

Description 

 was discovered on 15 January 2002 by astronomers of the NEAT team at Haleakala Observatory, Hawaii, United States. It was removed from the Sentry Risk Table on 3 February 2002.

It is a Mercury-, Venus-, Earth- and Mars-crossing asteroid. With an observation arc of 14 years, it has a well determined orbit and was last observed in 2016. It is classified as an Apollo asteroid because it is a near-Earth asteroid with a semi-major axis larger than Earth's. It is also categorized as a potentially hazardous asteroid, but that does not mean there is a near-term threat of an impact. It is a potentially hazardous asteroid merely as a result of its size (absolute magnitude ) and Earth minimum orbit intersection distance ).

2018 approach 

The 2018 Earth approach distance was known with a 3-sigma accuracy of ±200 km. Goldstone is scheduled to observe the asteroid from 3 to 6 February. By 4 February 2018 11:00 UT, the asteroid brightened to apparent magnitude 14 and had a solar elongation of more than 100°.

2172 approach 

The 2172 Earth approach distance is known with a 3-sigma accuracy of ±4000 km.

As we look even further into the future the known trajectory becomes more divergent.

References

External links 

 
 
 

276033
276033
276033
276033
276033
276033
276033
Near-Earth objects in 2018
20020115